West Gippsland Hospital is a regional hospital in Warragul, Victoria, first established in 1888 on land donated by a local resident, Mary Sargeant.

The current hospital is an 83-bed facility with an additional 60 beds available in the adjoining Cooinda Lodge Nursing Home.

References

External links
 West Gippsland Healthcare Group

Hospital buildings completed in 1888
Hospitals in Victoria (Australia)
Gippsland (region)
Shire of Baw Baw